Eilean Loain is a small island in Loch Sween and one of the Inner Hebrides of Scotland.

It is attended by the islet of Cala that lies to the north west.

Eilean Loain has a substantial jetty on the north shore and a large building  nearby and has been described as "inhabited" by Haswell-Smith (2004). Argyll and Bute Council records indicate the presence of a dwelling house and according to the National Records of Scotland census information the island is "included in the NRS statistical geography for inhabited islands but had no usual residents at the time of either the 2001 or 2011 censuses".

Eilean Loain is part of the Knapdale National Scenic Area, one of 40 in Scotland.

References

External links
 Canmore site record of jetty with aerial photograph
 Painting of Eilean Loain by Paul Murphy

Islands of Argyll and Bute